Lee Keun-ho (born: 11 April 1985) is a South Korean footballer who plays for Daegu FC and South Korea national team. His pace, work-rate, and link-up plays mark him as a highly rated forward in Asia. South Korean international since 2007, he currently has 19 goals in 84 caps. He represented his country in the 2014 FIFA World Cup.

Club career
After graduating from Bupyeong High School, Lee joined local side Incheon United in 2004. He stayed in Incheon's reserve team for three years, but got a chance to play for a K League club after winning the Best Player award in the R League contested between reserve teams. Daegu FC signed him at the beginning of 2007 season.

Daegu FC manager Byun Byung-joo brought the fast and extremely aggressive "bullet football" tactic to his team. bringin Lee into the spotlight. He became the top scorer among South Korean players in 2007 and 2008 K League.

Lee wanted to leave for Europe after the end of the contract with Daegu in December 2008. Several European clubs showed their interest in him, and he was offered a trial from Premier League club Blackburn Rovers. However, he turned it down because he worried about the hard competition for a starting position in Blackburn. He signed for J1 League club Júbilo Iwata on a nine-month contract in April 2009. He tried to move to Ligue 1 club Paris Saint-Germain in June after playing for Júbilo Iwata for two months, but failed to negotiate with Paris. He finally signed a contract extension with Júbilo Iwata until July 2010.

Lee joined Gamba Osaka in June 2010. He scored 15 goals while playing 32 matches for Gamba in the 2011 J1 League.

On 10 January 2012, he returned to South Korea, signing for Ulsan Hyundai on a three-year deal. During a year in Ulsan, he led his team to the AFC Champions League title, winning the Asian Footballer of the Year award and the Champions League MVP award. The next year, he was transferred to Sangju Sangmu to perform his military service as per South Korean law.

International career
Lee was selected for the 2005 FIFA World Youth Championship in Netherlands. However, for most matches, he remained in the bench, not playing a single match in the group stage, while his team-mate Park Chu-young made good impressions. He was confirmed in the Summer Olympics squad in 2006, and became the most valuable player in the squad to qualify for the Olympic games. He was selected for the 2007 AFC Asian Cup, and also capped for the South Korea under-23 team in qualification for the 2008 Summer Olympics.

On 29 June 2007, Lee made his senior team debut in a friendly against Iraq through substitution in the second half. Lee also managed to score his debut goal from an assist made by Lee Chun-soo. On 15 October 2008, Lee scored two goals in a qualification match of the 2010 FIFA World Cup against United Arab Emirates. On 19 November 2008, Lee scored the most important goal in his international career yet in an away game against Saudi Arabia, which ended South Korea's nineteen-year losing spell against the Saudis. Although he played in most of the qualification campaign, he was not named for the team to participate in the 2010 World Cup.

Lee was included in South Korea's squad for the 2014 FIFA World Cup by showing good performances with three goals in the final round of the qualification. In their first group stage match against Russia on 17 June 2014, he came on as a substitute for Park Chu-young in the 52nd minute and scored his first ever World Cup goal in a 1–1 draw when his shot from outside the box was spilled by goalkeeper Igor Akinfeev over his head and over the line. He also assisted Koo Ja-cheol's goal in the second match against Algeria.

Personal life
Lee was born in Incheon, South Korea. He is well known for his friendship with Ha Dae-sung. Having played together in elementary, middle, and high school, they also played together at Daegu FC. His older brother Lee Won-ho is coaching a local side in Incheon.

Lee is the inaugural president of FIFPro Korea, South Korea's official players' union, since it gained Candidate Member status.

He has been supporting a former football player who suffered a heart attack during a match in 2011.

In 2015, he was appointed as the promotional ambassador of the Purme Foundation, which helps disabled children in their path of rehabilitation and is based in Gangneung. During his fellowship with the association, he organized several charity football matches and clinics to help the child patients by providing them with scholarships and appropriate equipment. In 2017, he also donated a correspondent of ₩100 million (about $90,200) to the foundation.

Following the forest wildfire that brought severe damages all over the Gangwon Province in 2019, Lee offered financial support to help the process of recover and rebuilding. He also made donations to the local health services in order to help fight the COVID-19 pandemic.

Thanks to his leading attitude both on and off the pitch and his charity activities, Lee was nominated for the 2020 FIFPro Merit Awards, three special prizes assigned to the footballers who distinguished themselves the most for their impact out of the playing field and their activism.

Career statistics

Club

International

Honours
Júbilo Iwata
J.League Cup: 2010

Ulsan Hyundai
Korean FA Cup runner-up: 2018
AFC Champions League: 2012, 2020

Sangju Sangmu
K League 2: 2013

Jeonbuk Hyundai Motors
K League 1: 2015

South Korea
 AFC Asian Cup runner-up: 2015
 EAFF Championship: 2008, 2017

Individual
K League 1 Best XI: 2007, 2008, 2012, 2017
AFC Champions League Most Valuable Player: 2012
AFC Player of the Year: 2012
K League 2 Most Valuable Player: 2013
K League 2 top goalscorer: 2013
K League 2 Best XI: 2013
Korean FA Goal of the Year: 2014

References

External links

 イ･グノ ジュビロ磐田 Jubilo IWATA
 
 Lee Keun-ho – National Team stats at KFA 
 
 

1985 births
Living people
Association football forwards
South Korean footballers
South Korean expatriate footballers
South Korea under-20 international footballers
South Korea under-23 international footballers
South Korea international footballers
Incheon United FC players
Daegu FC players
Júbilo Iwata players
Gamba Osaka players
Ulsan Hyundai FC players
Gimcheon Sangmu FC players
El Jaish SC players
Jeonbuk Hyundai Motors players
J1 League players
Jeju United FC players
Gangwon FC players
K League 1 players
K League 2 players
K League 2 Most Valuable Player Award winners
Qatar Stars League players
Expatriate footballers in Japan
South Korean expatriate sportspeople in Japan
Expatriate footballers in Qatar
South Korean expatriate sportspeople in Qatar
2007 AFC Asian Cup players
Footballers at the 2008 Summer Olympics
2014 FIFA World Cup players
2015 AFC Asian Cup players
Olympic footballers of South Korea
Asian Footballer of the Year winners
Sportspeople from Incheon